Herman Glogowski (April 29, 1854 – December 3, 1909) was a four-time mayor of Tampa, Florida in the later 1880s and early 1890s. He was first elected mayor on August 13, 1886, and served until July 15, 1887. He was elected again to a second term on March 8, 1888, and served until March 6, 1889. He was re-elected two terms and served from March 5, 1890, to March 4, 1891, and from March 4, 1892, to March 10, 1893.

Glogowski is the only person in Tampa history to serve four terms as mayor non-consecutively.

Life and career

Early life 
Glogowski was born in Germany to parents of Jewish descent. In 1867 he immigrated to the United States living in New York City where he worked in the city's garment industry for roughly 15 years. In late 1882, he would move to Gainesville, Florida, where he would marry Bertha Brown in 1883. After living in Gainesville for a year, Glogowski settled in Tampa and opened a men's orientated clothing store on Washington Street.

Mayor of Tampa 
Glogowski later got involved in local politics and was elected as the 21st mayor of Tampa for a one-year term in August 1886 being the first Jewish mayor of Tampa. He was elected again for another one-year term in March 1888. He then served two more terms as mayor of Tampa, from March 5, 1890, to March 4, 1891, and from March 4, 1892, to March 10, 1893.

Later life 
After his mayorship he would remain active in the community. He would lay the cornerstone for Tampa's first synagogue Schaarai Zedek, in 1899.

He was killed in a horse and buggy accident in Tampa on December 3, 1909.

References

1854 births
1909 deaths
German emigrants to the United States
Mayors of Tampa, Florida
People from Gainesville, Florida
Jewish mayors of places in the United States
Florida Republicans